The Romanians in France are French citizens of Romanian heritage who are born in Romania and live as immigrants in France or are born in France from a Romanian immigrant family that came to France in the early 20th century. As of 2019, there were 133,000 Romanian-born citizens living in France, and there is an unknown number of French citizens with Romanian ancestry.

History 

Romanians had registered a presence on France's soil since the first part of the 19th century.  The first Romanians that arrived at that time were mainly rich students who came to study, principally in science and physics domains.  Most of them returned to Romania after finishing their studies, although a significant number remained in France. During World War I, some Romanian soldiers were sent to France when the Kingdom of Romania joined the Allies in 1916, to help French troops in the fight against Germany.

An important figure of the Romanian-French population arrived in France in the 1950s, after the end of the war, in a period when both Romania and France were experiencing a very difficult period in their history, and were still recovering from the disasters caused by the conflict.  Most of the Romanian population settled in Paris, Lille and other big cities in the north of France.

Another large wave of Romanian emigrants made their way in France in the 1990s, after the fall of Communism in Romania, caused by the Romanian Revolution of 1989. After that important event, millions of Romanians left their homeland in order to come to the West, to the United States, Canada, Germany, Italy, France, United Kingdom, Spain, etc., where up to this day they still form significant communities. More than half of the present-day number of Romanian-French arrived after 1990.

French language in Romania 
English and French are the main foreign languages taught in schools. In 2010, the Organisation internationale de la Francophonie identifies  French speakers in the country. According to the 2012 Eurobarometer, English is spoken by 59% of Romanians, French is spoken by 25%.

Notable people

Art 
Constantin Brâncuși (1876–1957), sculptor and painter
Margaret Cossaceanu (1893–1980), sculptor
 (1925–2006), painter and sculptor
Horia Damian (1922–2012), painter and sculptor
Natalia Dumitresco (1915–1997), painter
Tania Mouraud (b. 1942), contemporary artist
Stefan Ramniceanu (b. 1954), painter and visual artist

Film and television 
Jean Aurel (1925–1996), film director and screenwriter
Claude Berri (1934–2009), film director, producer and screenwriter (Romanian mother)
Lorànt Deutsch (b. 1975), actor (Romanian mother)
Julie Dreyfus (b. 1966), actress
Jany Holt (1909–2005), actress
Eva Ionesco (b. 1965), actress, film director and screenwriter
Michèle Laroque (b. 1960), actress and screenwriter (Romanian mother)
Lana Marconi (1917–1990), actress
Alexandre Mihalesco (1883–1974), actor
Radu Mihăileanu (b. 1958), film director and screenwriter 
Elvira Popescu (1894–1993), actress
Josiane Stoléru (b. 1949), actress
Laurent Terzieff (1935–2010), actor
Anamaria Vartolomei (b. 1999), actress

Literature   
Linda Baros (b. 1981), poet
Marthe Bibesco (1886–1973), poet
Emil Cioran (1911–1995), essayist 
Petru Dumitriu (1924–2002), novelist
Constantin Gheorghiu (1916–1992), novelist
Paul Goma (1935–2020), novelist
Eugène Ionesco (1909–1994), playwright
Salim Jay (b. 1951), novelist (Romanian mother)
Anna de Noailles (1876–1933), poet
Dumitru Țepeneag (b. 1937), novelist
Tristan Tzara (1896–1963), poet, playwright and founder of the Dada movement
Elena Văcărescu (1864–1947), poet 
Matei Vișniec (b. 1956), novelist

Music 
Sergiu Celibidache (1912–1996), conductor and composer 
Marius Constant (1925–2004), composer and conductor
Vladimir Cosma (b. 1940), composer, conductor and violinist 
Francis Dreyfus (1940–2010), record producer
George Enescu (1881–1955), composer, violinist, pianist, and conductor 
Mareva Galanter (b. 1979), singer and former Miss France 1999
Costin Miereanu (b. 1943), composer 
Horațiu Rădulescu (1942–2008), composer
Lydie Solomon (b. 1982), pianist
Pierre Vassiliu (1937–2014), singer and songwriter

Politics 
Lionnel Luca (b. 1954), member of the National Assembly of France
Roxana Mărăcineanu (b. 1975), current Minister of Youth and Sports of France 
Lionel Stoléru (1937–2016), politician
Nicolae Titulescu (1882–1941), politician

Sports 
Anne-Marie Bănuță (b. 1991), footballer
Ania Monica Caill (b. 1995), alpine skier 
Alexandra Dascalu (b. 1991), volleyball player
Ana Filip, (b. 1989), basketball player
 (b. 1985), rugby union player (Romanian mother) 
Viorel Moldovan (b. 1972), footballer and manager
Victoria Muntean (b. 1997), tennis player
Rodica Nagel (b. 1970), long-distance runner
Cédric Pioline (b. 1969), tennis player (Romanian mother) 
Rudi Prisăcaru (b. 1970), handballer
Jean-Charles Skarbowsky (b. 1975), kickboxer (Romanian mother)
 (b. 1993), rugby union player
Cynthia Vescan (b. 1992), freestyle wrestler 
Victor Zvunka (b. 1951), footballer and manager

Other  
Antoine Bibesco (1878–1951), diplomat 
Henri Coandă (1886–1972), inventor and aerodynamics pioneer
Paul Cornu (1881-1944), engineer designing the world's first successful manned rotary wing aircraft
Mattei Dogan (1920–2010), sociologist 
Cyprien Iov (b. 1989), comedian and YouTube personality 
Constantin Levaditi (1874–1953), microbiologist
Eli Lotar (1905–1969), photographer and cinematographer
Henri Negresco (1870–1920), founder of the Hotel Negresco in Nice
Gabriel Badea-Päun (b. 1973), art historian
Valentin Poénaru (b. 1932), mathematician
Alexandru Proca (1897–1955), physicist
Élisabeth Roudinesco (b. 1944), historian and psychoanalyst
Sonia Rykiel (1930–2016), fashion designer

See also  
France–Romania relations
Romanians in Germany
Romanians in Italy
Romanians in Spain
Romanians in the United Kingdom
Romanian Australians
Romanian Americans
Romanian Argentines
Romanian Brazilians
Romanian Canadians

External links 
 Communauté Roumaine en France/Romanian Community in France

References 

 
European diaspora in France
France
France
Immigration to France by country of origin